The 2021 CS Autumn Classic International was held on September 16–18, 2021 in Pierrefonds, Quebec. It was part of the 2021–22 ISU Challenger Series. Medals were awarded in the disciplines of men's singles, women's singles, pairs, and ice dance; the men's event was not considered as part of the Challenger due to the entry requirements not being met.

Entries 
The International Skating Union published the list of entries on August 24, 2021. The pairs segment was added on September 1, 2021.

Changes to preliminary assignments

Results

Men 
Note: For this category, the 2021 Autumn Classic was not considered a Challenger Series event, since the minimum required number of entries for a Challenger Series event was not reached.

Women

Pairs

Ice dance

References

External links 
 Autumn Classic International at the International Skating Union
 Results

Autumn Classic
Autumn Classic
Sport in Quebec
Autumn Classic International
CS Autumn Classic International